Sagarmal Gopa (2 November/3 November 1900 – 4 April 1946) was a freedom fighter and patriot from Jaisalmer, Rajasthan, India. His father Akhairaj gopa was a courtier in Maharawal Jawahar Singh's court. Sagarmal Gopa had recorded the atrocities of Jawahar Singh, the contemporary ruler of Jaisalmer, in his book "Jaisalmer ka Gundaraj", after which the enmity between Jawahar Singh and Sagarmal Gopa increased. He took active part in the Non-cooperation movement in 1921. He opposed anti-people policies of then rulers of Jaisalmer. He was expelled from Jaisalmer and Hyderabad. Even in exile he continued to work for freedom movement. After his father's death in 1941, on his return to Jaisalmer he was arrested on 25 May 1941. Sagermal gopa tortured in prison for years. He was burnt to death in the prison on 4 April 1946. "Gopal Swaroop Pathak commission" was formed to investigate the murder of Sagarmal Gopa, which under the influence of Jawahar Singh, declared this murder as suicide. 3 books were written by gopa 1) aajadi ke diwane 2) jaisalmer ka gundaraj 3) raghunath singh ka mukadma

The Government of India issued a postage stamp in 1986 in honour of Sagarmal Gopa. A branch of Indira Gandhi Canal is named after him.

References 

Indian independence activists from Rajasthan
1946 deaths
1900 births
People from Jaisalmer district